Ratha Sapthami is a 1986 Indian Kannada-language romantic musical film directed by M. S. Rajashekar and produced by S. A. Govindaraj. It stars Shiva Rajkumar in his second venture after Anand. Debutant actress Asha Rani and playwright Parvathavani star. The musical score was composed by Upendra Kumar, while the lyrics, screenplay and dialogues were written by Chi. Udaya Shankar. P. Vasu was the co-screen play writer of this movie. The story is based on a Kannada novel of the same name by Vidyullatha Sasanoor. Ratha Sapthami opened on 12 December 1986 and was declared a musical blockbuster.

Co-screen play writer P. Vasu remade the movie in Tamil in 1996 as Love Birds.

The interval twist of the movie - where the hero supposedly dies in an accident - and the second half of the movie - where the heroine is sent out of her hometown to her uncle's place in order to overcome her depression but is shell shocked to find a lookalike in a vehicle nearby and later catches a glimpse of him again in a discotheque dancing merrily - went on to be re-used in the 2000 Hindi movie Kaho Naa... Pyaar Hai.

Cast

Shiva Rajkumar as Vishwanath/Lawrence
Asha Rani as Deepa
Parvathavani
Doddanna as Srikantaiah, Deepa's father
Kanchana as Sharada, Vishwa's mother
Rajeshwari
Prashanthi Nayak
Sudha Narasimharaju as Sumathi, Vishwa's younger sister
Kumari Rekha
Mysore Lokesh
Shivaprakash
Thimmaiah
Sadashiva Brahmavar
Bharathish
Bheema Rao
Aravind as Jagadish
Chi Ravishankar
Honnavalli Krishna
Krishna
Balaraj
Sundar Raj
Srinath
Roopa Devi

Soundtrack

References

External links 
 

1986 films
1980s Kannada-language films
Indian romantic musical films
Films based on Indian novels
Films directed by M. S. Rajashekar
Films scored by Upendra Kumar
Kannada films remade in other languages
1980s romantic musical films